Cherniyevo is a rural locality (a village) in Bogorodskoye Rural Settlement, Ust-Kubinsky  District, Vologda Oblast, Russia. The population was 1 as of 2002.

Geography 
Cherniyevo is located 56 km northwest of Ustye (the district's administrative centre) by road. Yermolinskaya is the nearest rural locality.

References 

Rural localities in Tarnogsky District